The 38th Annual Annie Awards honoring the best in animation of 2010 was held February 5, 2011, at Royce Hall in Los Angeles, California. DreamWorks Animation's How to Train Your Dragon was the big winner winning 10 out of its 15 nominations, sparking a big controversy over Disney and Pixar's boycott.

Production nominees
Nominations announced on December 6, 2010.

Best Animated Feature
How to Train Your Dragon – DreamWorks Animation
 Despicable Me – Illumination Entertainment
 Tangled – Walt Disney Pictures
 The Illusionist – Django Films
 Toy Story 3 – Disney/Pixar

Best Animated Short Subject
Day & Night – Disney/Pixar Coyote Falls - Warner Bros. Animation
 Enrique Wrecks the World - House of Chai
 The Cow Who Wanted To Be A Hamburger - Plymptoons Studio
 The Renter - Jason Carpenter

Best Animated Television CommercialChildren's Medical Center - DUCK Studios Frito Lay Dips "And Then There Was Salsa" - LAIKA/house
 ‘How To Train Your Dragon’ Winter Olympic Interstitial "Speed Skating" - DreamWorks Animation
 McDonald's "Spaceman Stu" - DUCK Studios
 Pop Secret "When Harry Met Sally" - Nathan Love

Best Animated Television Production
 Futurama - The Curiosity Company in association with 20th Century Fox Television Scared Shrekless - DreamWorks Animation
 Star Wars: The Clone Wars “Arc Troopers” - Lucasfilm Animation, Ltd.
 The Simpsons - Gracie Films

Best Animated Television Production for ChildrenSpongeBob SquarePants – Nickelodeon Adventure Time - Cartoon Network Studios
 Cloudbread – GIMC
 Fanboy & Chum Chum - Nickelodeon, Frederator
 Regular Show - Cartoon Network Studios

Best Animated Video GameLimbo – Playdead Heavy Rain - Quantic Dream
 Kirby's Epic Yarn - Good-Feel & HAL Laboratory
 Shank - Klei Entertainment Inc.

Individual Achievement Categories
Animated Effects in an Animated ProductionBrett Miller - How To Train Your Dragon - DreamWorks Animation Andrew Young Kim - Shrek Forever After - DreamWorks Animation
 Jason Mayer - How To Train Your Dragon - DreamWorks Animation
 Sebastian Quessy - Legend of the Guardians: The Owls of Ga'Hoole - Warner Bros. Pictures
 Kryzstof Rost - Megamind - DreamWorks Animation

Character Animation in a Television ProductionDavid Pate - Kung Fu Panda Holiday - DreamWorks Animation Nicolas A. Chauvelot - "Scared Shrekless" - DreamWorks Animation
 Savelon Forrest - Robot Chicken: Star Wars Episode III - ShadowMachine
 Elizabeth Havetine - Robot Chicken: Star Wars Episode III – ShadowMachine
 Nideep Varghese - Scared Shrekless - DreamWorks Animation

Character Animation in a Feature ProductionGabe Hordos - How To Train Your Dragon - DreamWorks Animation Mark Donald - Megamind - DreamWorks Animation
 Anthony Hodgson - Megamind - DreamWorks Animation
 Jakob Hjort Jensen - How To Train Your Dragon - DreamWorks Animation
 David Torres - How To Train Your Dragon - DreamWorks Animation

Character Animation in a Live Action ProductionRyan Page - Alice in Wonderland
 Quentin Miles - Clash of the Titans

Character Design in a Television Production
Ernie Gilbert - T.U.F.F. Puppy – Nickelodeon
 Andy Bialk - The Ricky Gervais Show - W!LDBRAIN Entertainment
 Stephan DeStefano - Sym-Bionic Titan - Cartoon Network
 Gordon Hammond - T.U.F.F. Puppy – Nickelodeon
 Steve Lam - Fanboy & Chum Chum - Nickelodeon, Frederator

Character Design in a Feature Production
Nico Marlet - How To Train Your Dragon - DreamWorks Animation
 Sylvain Chomet - The Illusionist - Django Films
 Carter Goodrich - Despicable Me - Illumination Entertainment
 Timothy Lamb - Megamind - DreamWorks Animation

Directing in a Television Production
Tim Johnson - Kung Fu Panda Holiday - DreamWorks Animation
 Bob Anderson - The Simpsons - Gracie Films
 Peter Chung - Firebreather - Cartoon Network Studios
 Duke Johnson - Frankenhole: Humanitas – ShadowMachine
 Gary Trousdale - Scared Shrekless - DreamWorks Animation

Directing in a Feature Production
Chris Sanders, Dean DeBlois - How To Train Your Dragon - DreamWorks Animation
 Sylvain Chomet - The Illusionist - Django Films
 Pierre Coffin - Despicable Me – Illumination Entertainment
 Mamoru Hosoda - Summer Wars – Madhouse/Funimation
 Lee Unkrich - Toy Story 3 – Pixar

Music in a Television Production
Jeremy Wakefield, Sage Guyton, Nick Carr and Tuck Tucker - SpongeBob SquarePants – Nickelodeon
 J. Walter Hawkes - The Wonder Pets! - Nickelodeon Production & Little Airplane Productions
 Henry Jackman, Hans Zimmer and John Powell - Kung Fu Panda Holiday - DreamWorks Animation
 Tim Long, Alf Clausen, Bret McKenzie, Jemaine Clement - The Simpsons: Elementary School Musical - Gracie Films
 Shawn Patterson - Robot Chicken's DP Christmas Special – ShadowMachine

Music in a Feature Production
John Powell - How To Train Your Dragon - DreamWorks Animation
 Sylvain Chomet - The Illusionist - Django Films
 David Hirschfelder - Legend of the Guardians: The Owls of Ga'Hoole - Warner Bros. Pictures
 Harry Gregson Williams - Shrek Forever After - DreamWorks Animation
 Pharrell Williams, Heitor Pereira - Despicable Me - Illumination Entertainment

Production Design in a Television Production
Richie Sacilioc - Kung Fu Panda Holiday - DreamWorks Animation
 Alan Bodner - Neighbors from Hell - 20th Century Fox Television
 Barry Jackson - Firebreather - Cartoon Network Studios
 Pete Oswald - Doubtsourcing - Badmash Animation Studios
 Scott Wills - Sym-Bionic Titan - Cartoon Network Studios

Production Design in a Feature Production
Pierre Olivier Vincent - How To Train Your Dragon - DreamWorks Animation
 Yarrow Cheney - Despicable Me - Illumination Entertainment
 Eric Guillon - Despicable Me - Illumination Entertainment
 Dan Hee Ryu - Legend of the Guardians: The Owls of Ga'Hoole - Warner Bros. Pictures
 Peter Zaslav - Shrek Forever After - DreamWorks Animation

Storyboarding in a Television Production
Fred Gonzales - T.U.F.F. Puppy – Nickelodeon
 Sean Bishop - Scared Shrekless - DreamWorks Animation
 Tom Owens - Kung Fu Panda Holiday - DreamWorks Animation
 Dave Thomas - Fairly OddParents – Nickelodeon

Storyboarding in a Feature Production
Tom Owens - How To Train Your Dragon - DreamWorks Animation
 Alessandro Carloni - How To Train Your Dragon - DreamWorks Animation
 Paul Fisher - Shrek Forever After - DreamWorks Animation
 Catherine Yuh Rader - Megamind - DreamWorks Animation

Voice Acting in a Feature Production
Jay Baruchel as Hiccup - How To Train Your Dragon - DreamWorks Animation
 Gerard Butler  as Stoick - How To Train Your Dragon - DreamWorks Animation
 Steve Carell  as Gru - Despicable Me - Illumination Entertainment
 Cameron Diaz  as Fiona - Shrek Forever After - DreamWorks Animation
 Geoffrey Rush  as Ezylryb - Legend of the Guardians: The Owls of Ga'Hoole - Warner Bros. Pictures

Voice Acting in a Television Production
James Hong  as Mr. Ping - Kung Fu Panda Holiday - DreamWorks Animation
 Jeff Bennett as The Necronomicon - Fanboy & Chum Chum - Nickelodeon & Frederator
 Corey Burton  as Baron Papanoida - Star Wars: The Clone Wars - Cartoon Network
 Nika Futterman  as Asajj Ventress - Star Wars: The Clone Wars - Cartoon Network
 Mike Henry  as Cleveland Brown - The Cleveland Show - Fox Television Animation

Writing in a Television Production
Geoff Johns, Matthew Beans, Zeb Wells, Hugh Sterbakov, Matthew Senreich, Breckin Meyer, Seth Green, Mike Fasolo, Douglas Goldstein, Tom Root, Dan Milano, Kevin Shinick & Hugh Davidson - "Robot Chicken: Star Wars Episode III" – ShadowMachine
 Daniel Arkin - "Star Wars: The Clone Wars: Heroes on Both Sides" - Lucasfilm Animation Ltd.
 Jon Colton Barry & Piero Piluso - "Phineas & Ferb: Nerds of a Feather" - Disney Channel
 Billy Kimball & Ian Maxtone-Graham - "The Simpsons: Stealing First Base" - Gracie Films
 Michael Rowe - "Futurama" - The Curiosity Company in association with 20th Century Fox Television

Writing in a Feature Production
William Davies, Dean DeBlois, Chris Sanders - How to Train Your Dragon – DreamWorks Animation
 Michael Arndt  - Toy Story 3 – Pixar
 Sylvain Chomet - The Illusionist – Django Films
 Dan Fogelman - Tangled - Disney
 Alan J. Schoolcraft, Brent Simons - Megamind – DreamWorks Animation

References

External links
 Annie Awards Nomination list
 Winners of the 38th Annie Awards for Animated Films and Television

2010
2010 film awards
Annie Awards
Annie